Santa Rita is a town in Santa Rita District of the Alto Paraná Department, Paraguay.

Santa Rita District, Paraguay